A Security Force Assistance Brigade (SFAB) (pronounced ) is a specialized United States Army unit formed to conduct security force assistance (SFA) missions: to train, advise, assist, enable and accompany operations with allied and partner nations. SFABs are intended to reduce the burden of such operations on conventionally-organized Brigade Combat Teams (BCTs), allowing BCTs to focus on fighting near-peer threats.

Designed on the model of a standard infantry brigade combat team, SFABs are composed of roughly 800 personnel, primarily commissioned and non-commissioned officers selected from regular Army units and given additional training at the Military Advisor Training Academy (MATA) at Fort Benning, Georgia.

History
A primary tenet of U.S. Strategy during the Global War on Terror (GWOT) was building the capacity and capability of national and local security forces to combat the conditions believed to fuel extremism and terrorist activities. The Department of Defense utilized two primary joint constructs to provide this needed capabillty, MiTTs trained the Iraqi Army and National Police and ETTs did the same in Afghanistan. Training over 350,000 Soldiers and Police between the two nations MiTTs and ETTs were heavily employed but suffered from a lack of standardization in programs of instructions, force structure, and selection criteria. To address both the shortfalls of MiTTs and ETTs and concurrently respond to the growing need for global SFA engagement the Army utilized portions of Brigade Combat Teams (BCTs) as Regionally Aligned Forces (RAF). Utilizing BCTs as RAF as the primary mechanism to deliver SFA mitigated many of the issues of MiTTs and ETTs but also negatively affected the readiness of BCTs to prepare and execute their primary role, win in large�scale ground combat operations leading to the creation of the dedicated Security Force Assistance Brigades in 2017. 

From August 2017 to May 2020 the Army established six Security Force Assistance Brigades (SFABs). Originally designed to provide advise, assist, and accompany capabilities to Afghan, Iraqi, and Peshmerga Security Forces, the Army reorganized SFABs in 2019 to meet the global challenges inherent to strategic competition. With the completion of global alignment in summer 2021, SFABs transitioned and assumed a role the Secretary and Chief of Staff of the Army described as “the Army’s leading edge of campaigning.” In addition to providing Combatant Commands’ persistent, predictable, and effective capabilities during competition SFABs provide the Joint Force the vital capability of integrating, synchronizing, and operationalizing America’s unsurpassed network of Allies and partners during crisis and conflict. SFABs’ role in crisis and conflict has not only been tested during Combat Training Center rotations and Warfighter Exercises, it was put to use as part of EUCOM and NATO’s assure and deter operations during Russia’s invasion of Ukraine in February 2022.

Overview

The mission of the SFAB is to carry out train, advise, and assist (TAA) missions overseas with foreign nation military partners. SFABs are the United States Army's latest solution to providing dedicated and trained personnel to relieve the Brigade Combat Teams from performing combat advisory missions and enable them to focus on their primary combat mission.
 Before SFABs, the combat advisory role was filled by non-commissioned officers and commissioned officers detailed from the Brigade Combat Teams to train host nation military forces, leaving critical leadership billets unfilled. Operating in units with roughly 800 personnel, SFABs are designed to be versatile and deployable worldwide and are made up exclusively of NCOs and officers, however E-4s with promotable status are accepted and receive promotion to sergeant (E-5) upon graduation of MATA.

SFABs are conventional units composed of volunteers recruited from units across the Regular Army. Volunteers undergo a two-day assessment at Fort Benning which evaluates a candidate's physical fitness, decision-making, problem solving, and communications skills as well as their ethics and morals. All SFAB volunteers then attend MATA training. Trainees may receive additional language training, culture training, foreign weapons training and medical training, among other topics. The SFABs are equipped with secure, but unclassified communications gear, utilizing T2C2 (Transportable Tactical Command Communications) systems, a novel type of backpack satellite voice and data terminals. CECOM is augmenting this gear with vehicle-mounted, and hand-carried radios.

In March 2020, Logistics Advisor Team 1610, 6th Battalion, 1st Security Force Assistance Brigade delivered a Vehicle Maintenance and Recovery Course to the Senegalese Army in Dakar, Senegal. This was 1st SFAB's first mission in USARAF's area of responsibility.

The existence of SFABs are part of a broader trend by the US military to specialize in the provision of military aid and assistance to "weak states" in trying to stand up capable security institutions in the host-nation. However, it is unclear if the SFABs will be able to overcome the "three SFA traps" of trying to create an effective military in a recipient state that cannot afford an army, views their army as a threat, or uses that army to consolidate power and settle scores with rivals.

SFAB organizational structure

The 1st Security Force Assistance Brigade was the first SFAB raised in the United States Army. Based in Fort Benning, Georgia the 1st SFAB is made up of the first graduates of MATA and are under the command of Colonel  Christopher Landers and Command Sergeant Major Christopher Goodart. On February 8, 2018 the 1st SFAB held its official activation ceremony at the National Infantry Museum on Fort Benning, Georgia. The Army plans to raise a total of six SFABs, five of which will be in the active duty Army, and one in the Army National Guard.  The Indiana Army National Guard is providing the headquarters for the newly designated 54th SFAB. 1st Battalion is being organized by the Georgia Army National Guard. Two battalions are being organized by the Florida Army National Guard, the 3rd Squadron, 54th Cavalry, and the 2nd Infantry Battalion.

According to Meghann Myers, the U.S. Army prioritized installations that are also home to divisions, with a two-star general on site to provide guidance and facilitate training, as homes for the Security Force Assistance Brigades.

On May 18, 2018, the Army announced that the Security Force Assistance Command (SFAC) will be established at Fort Bragg. This division-level Command, led by a Brigadier General, will oversee the Army’s six Security Force Assistance Brigades, as well as the MATA for SFAB training and oversight. SFAC and 2nd SFAB were activated on 3 December 2018 at Fort Bragg; BG Mark Landes and BG Donn Hill are the Commanding Generals of SFAC and  2nd SFAB, respectively.

By 2020, the SFABs are to include missions to US Central Command, US Southern Command, US Indo-Pacific Command, and US Africa Command. According to a US military journal, "such specialized security force assistance units is a stopgap measure that frees up more resources for conventional warfare, allowing the rest of the US military to focus on combined-arms training and equipping for conflict and competition with China and Russia."

SFAB recruiting
The SFAB Recruiting and Retention Team was formed to provide SFAB leader development briefs and recruit Army-wide Soldiers and leaders for SFAB opportunities.  
Eligible Soldiers volunteer for SFAB assignments by completing two SFAB Volunteer forms DA Form 4187 (Personnel Request) and SF 600 (Medical Screening) and e-mailing both to the Human Resources Command (HRC) SFAB Team for screening.  On May 15, 2018, Army officials released new guidance on the Army's Selective Retention Bonus (SRB) Program, which includes first-ever bonuses up to $52,000 for those who reenlist for critical Security Forces Assistance Brigade positions.

List of Security Force Assistance Brigades

See also 
 11th Security Force Assistance Brigade - British Army equivalent.

References 

Brigades of the United States Army
Military advisory groups